Trygve Carlsen Bøyesen (18 February 1886 – 27 July 1963) was a Norwegian gymnast who competed in the 1908 Summer Olympics, the 1912 Summer Olympics, and the 1920 Summer Olympics.

He won a silver medal in the gymnastics team event in 1908 with the Norwegian team. As a member of the Norwegian team, he won a bronze medal in the gymnastics team, Swedish system event in 1912. Eight years later, he was part of the Norwegian team, which won the silver medal in the gymnastics team, free system event.

References

1886 births
1963 deaths
Norwegian male artistic gymnasts
Gymnasts at the 1908 Summer Olympics
Gymnasts at the 1912 Summer Olympics
Gymnasts at the 1920 Summer Olympics
Olympic gymnasts of Norway
Olympic silver medalists for Norway
Olympic bronze medalists for Norway
Olympic medalists in gymnastics
Medalists at the 1920 Summer Olympics
Medalists at the 1912 Summer Olympics
Medalists at the 1908 Summer Olympics
20th-century Norwegian people